Wiendorf is a village and a former municipality in the district Salzlandkreis, in Saxony-Anhalt, Germany. Since 1 January 2010, it has been part of the town Könnern.

Former municipalities in Saxony-Anhalt
Salzlandkreis